Pennfield may refer to:

Pennfield Parish, New Brunswick, a civil parish west of Saint John, Canada
the parish of Pennfield, a local service district covering most of the civil parish
Pennfield, New Brunswick, an unincorporated community in the civil parish
Pennfield Charter Township, Michigan, United States